

Achievements in Europe

UEFA-organised seasonal competitions

European Cup/UEFA Champions League

European Cup Winners' Cup/UEFA Cup Winners' Cup

UEFA Cup/UEFA Europa League

UEFA Europa Conference League

UEFA-non organised seasonal competitions

Inter-Cities Fairs Cup

FIFA Competitions

Intercontinental Cup

By competition

UEFA club ranking

Current ranking
As of 11 August 2022.

Recent rankings

References

Notes

European football
Greek football clubs in international competitions